"(Open Up the Door) Let the Good Times In" is a song that was released by Dean Martin in 1966. The song spent 6 weeks on the Billboard Hot 100 chart, peaking at No. 55, while reaching No. 7 on Billboards Easy Listening chart, and No. 51 on Canada's RPM 100.

Chart performance

References

1966 singles
1966 songs
Dean Martin songs
Reprise Records singles
Song recordings produced by Jimmy Bowen
Songs written by Mitchell Torok